Bantay Radyo (or El Nuevo Bantay Radyo, "The New Guardian Radio") is a Philippine radio network in the Visayas and Mindanao region owned by Sarraga Integrated and Management Corporation. Its main headquarters are located in Brgy. Capitol Site, Cebu City, with repeaters located in Bogo and Guihulngan.

History and background
Bantay Radyo is a network of AM radio stations each with a power of 10,000 kilowatts and strategically located in Cebu and in Negros Oriental. The network is owned by Cagayan de Oro–based Sarraga Integrated and Management Corporation, with the leadership of provincial Board Member Gigi Sanchez of the province of Cebu, as Chief Executive Officer. It was managed by PAFI Techno Resources Corporation from 2002 until mid-2015, when PAFI's contract with SIAM expired.

Demise
In 2009, Bantay Radyo Davao went off the air for unknown reasons.

On August 1, 2015, Bantay Radyo stations temporarily went off the air due to management issues. Representatives from SIAM confiscated their transmitter equipment. SIAM decided to let CFI Community Cooperative take over the operations of Bantay Radyo once PAFI's contract expired.

However, by 2022 it revived under the new management.

Radio stations

References

Radio stations in the Philippines
Radio stations established in 1991